The Klondike Open  is a darts tournament that has been held since 1958 in Edmonton, Alberta, Canada. The tournament is currently ranked by Darts Alberta, National Darts Federation of Canada, World Darts Federation, and British Darts Organisation. The organising body is the Edmonton City Dart League which has been in existence since 1946.

List of winners

Men's
Include:

Women's

References

External links
 NDFC
 Darts Alberta
 ECDL

1958 establishments in Alberta
Darts tournaments